Jenő Vincze (20 November 1908 – 20 November 1988) was a Hungarian footballer and a legend of Újpest FC, most famous for playing for the Hungarian national team in the 1938 World Cup Final.

Vincze started playing football for teams based in Debrecen. He became professional in 1927 at Debreceni Bocskai and he was top scorer of the Nemzeti Bajnokság I in the 1930–31 season and moved to Újpest FC in December 1934. He finished his career at Újpest in 1944.

He was considered one of the best Hungarian strikers in the 1930s, gaining 25 caps for the national team and playing on the world cup of 1934 and 1938.

After finishing his career, he became a successful coach.

References

1908 births
1988 deaths
People from Vršac
People from the Kingdom of Hungary
Hungarians in Vojvodina
Hungary international footballers
Hungarian footballers
Hungarian football managers
1934 FIFA World Cup players
1938 FIFA World Cup players
Újpest FC players
Újpest FC managers
SpVgg Greuther Fürth managers
Servette FC managers
FC Basel managers
Bundesliga managers
Association football forwards